Knuckleball is a 2018 Canadian thriller film written, directed  and co-produced by Michael Peterson. The movie was released on March 3, 2018, at the Cinequest Film & VR Festival.

Plot
Henry, a 12-year-old boy, finds out his family's dark legacy when his mysterious grandfather suddenly dies leaving him alone on an isolated farm.

Cast
 Michael Ironside as Jacob
 Munro Chambers as Dixon
 Luca Villacis as Henry
 Kathleen Munroe as Mary
 Chenier Hundal as Paul

Release

Reception
On review aggregator Rotten Tomatoes, Knuckleball has an approval rating of  based on  reviews. On Metacritic, another review aggregator which uses a weighted average, assigned the film a score of 55 out of 100 based on 5 critics, indicating "mixed or average reviews". Brad Wheeler from The Globe and Mail gave the movie 3 out of 4 starts, writing: "The Canadian-made creep-fest begins laboriously as co-writer/director Michael Peterson figures out how to rid the plot of any phones. (Every thrill-maker filmmaker has to deal with that pesky issue, but Peterson’s methods are slower than a Macaulay Culkin growth-spurt.) Otherwise, Knuckleball does not flutter" Dennis Harvey writing for Variety stated: "Michael Peterson effectively earns suspension of disbelief with stark atmospherics, solid performances and a persuasive escalation of panic." Noel Murray from the Los Angeles Times called "Knuckleball"" "effective" and said: "This is a tautly constructed exercise in suspense, set among striking-looking snowbound fields and farmhouses. It’s a vivid slice-of-life, even before the literal slicing begins."

Accolades
"Knuckleball" won the 2019 AMPIA Awards in the category of "Best Screenwriter (Drama over 30 minutes)" and was nominated for the same award in the categories of "Best Dramatic Feature" and "Best Director(Drama over 30 minutes)"

References

External links
 
 

Canadian thriller films
English-language Canadian films
2018 thriller films
2010s English-language films
2010s Canadian films